Traian Coșovei (24 March 1921, Somova, Tulcea County – 16 July 1993, Bucharest) was a Romanian writer and poet.

Traian Coșovei was born in the Danube Delta in a fisherman's family. After attending high school in Tulcea, he graduated from the Letters and Philosophy Department of the University of Bucharest in 1947.

A follower of socialist realism, he is known for having written highly positive reportages and journey accounts from his trip to the Soviet Union, and for having compared Nicolae Ceaușescu to national bard Mihai Eminescu.

The school in his home village is called in his honor.

He is the father of Traian T. Coșovei.

Books
La Taliane, București, 1950
Prietenie, București, 1951
Împărăția vânturilor, București, 1954
Sub cerul liber, București, 1954
Uriașul preludiu, București, 1955
Farmecul genezei, București, 1956
Dimensiuni. Peisaj sovietic, București, 1957
Dobrogea de aur, București, 1958
Cântec să crească băiatul, București, 1959
Semnul din larg, București, 1960
Oceanul, București, 1962
Răul porni mai departe, București, 1962
Stelele dimineţii, București, 1964
Firul de iarbă, București, 1965
Tânărul meu Ulise, București, 1966
Când mă grăbeam spre mare, București, 1967
Pe urmele voastre, București, 1967
Informaţia ereditară, București, 1969
Prietenă cu focul şi cu apa, București, 1969
Oda zilnică, București, 1970
O colibă sub fereastra ta, București, 1971
Fata cu părul lung, București, 1972
Lauda fluviului, București, 1974
Mai fericiţi decât Ulise, București, 1974
Tuturor drumurilor, București, 1974
La ţărmul cu lună, București, 1977
Dobrogea de aur, București, 1978
Farmecul geneza, București, 1979
Tropaeum Traiani, București, 1982
Banchetul toamnei, București, 1984
Când cerul se schimbă, București, 1987

Awards
Romanian Academy's "Alexandru Sahia" Award (1955)

References
Eusebiu Camilar, Cărțile săgetătorului, 1957
Sorin Bratu, Cronici, II, 1958
Ion Vitner, Prozatori contemporani, II, 1962
Cornel Regman, Cărți, autori, tendințe, 1967
Nicolae Manolescu, România literară, nr. 42, 1983
Ion Bălu, România litarară, nr. 3, 1985

1921 births
1993 deaths
Romanian writers
University of Bucharest alumni
People from Tulcea County